Paris Match is a French-language weekly news magazine. It covers major national and international news along with celebrity lifestyle features.

History and profile
A sports news magazine, Match l'intran (a play on L'Intransigeant), was launched on 9 November 1926 by Léon Bailby. It was acquired by the Louis-Dreyfus group in 1931 and then by the industrialist Jean Prouvost in 1938. Under Prouvost the magazine expanded its focus beyond sports, to a format reminiscent of Life: Le Match de la vie ("The Match of Life") and then Match, l'hebdomadaire de l'actualité mondiale ("Match, the weekly of world news"). Following the outbreak of World War II it became Match de la guerre ("Match of War") in October 1939. Selling for 2 francs a copy, it reached a circulation of 1.45 million by November.  Publication was halted on 6 June 1940, during the Battle of France.

The magazine was relaunched in 1949 with a new name, Paris Match. The magazine temporarily ceased its publication between 18 May and 15 June 1968 upon the call for a strike by the Syndicat du Livre, the French Printers' Union.

In 1976 Daniel Filipacchi purchased the ailing Paris Match, and it continues to be one of France's most successful and influential magazines. It is published weekly and is now part of Hachette Filipacchi Médias, which is itself owned by the Lagardère Group.

On occasion, Paris Match has sold more than one million copies worldwide when covering major events, such as the first flight by a French astronaut, Patrick Baudry, aboard the U.S. Space Shuttle Discovery in June 1985. Benoît Clair, a senior writer for Paris Match, was the first journalist allowed to join the shuttle crew members from training until the departure for the launch pad at Cape Canaveral. A series of reports on the training was published in Paris Match on 22 April 1985, 17 June 1985 and 20 January 1986.

As of 1996 the magazine has adopted an independent political stance.

Circulation
Paris Match had a circulation of 1,800,000 copies in 1958. The 1988 circulation of the magazine was 873,000, making it the best-selling news weekly in the country. In 2001 the weekly was the tenth-largest-circulation news magazine worldwide, with a 630,000 sale.

Paris Match had a circulation of 656,000 during the 2007–2008 period. In 2009 the magazine was the best-selling photonews magazine in France, with a circulation of 611,000 copies. Its circulation was 578,282 in 2014 and 568,115 in 2020.

In popular culture
In Hergé's Tintin adventure The Castafiore Emerald (1963), reporters from the imaginary "Paris-Flash" magazine (a clear spoof on Paris Match, with a similar logo) play a major role in the plot's development. The magazine is satirized as sensationalist and inaccurate.

References

External links

  

1949 establishments in France
French-language magazines
Lagardère Active
Magazines established in 1949
Magazines published in Paris
News magazines published in France
Photojournalistic magazines
Weekly magazines published in France
Weekly news magazines